Nicole Christine Branagh (born January 31, 1979, in Orinda, California) is an American volleyball player. She has represented the United States in international competition as a member of both the indoor and beach national teams. With partner Elaine Youngs, Branagh competed in the beach volleyball tournament at the 2008 Summer Olympics, finishing fifth. She currently plays beach volleyball professionally as a right-side defender.

Career
Branagh played collegiately at the University of Minnesota. She was twice named to the All-America Second Team as an outside hitter. She also was the Big Ten's co-Player of the Year in her senior season. Following graduation, she played for the United States women's national volleyball team from 2001 to 2003, finishing her national career after the 2003 Pan American Games, where she won a bronze medal and was the top scorer.

After spending the 2004 season as a volunteer assistant coach at Cal State Fullerton, Branagh began playing beach volleyball on the AVP Pro Tour and the FIVB World Tour. She has won 17 AVP events and 3 FIVB World Tour events over the course of her career. She was named the AVP Rookie of the Year in 2005 and the Most Improved Player in 2006 and 2008. She partnered with Holly McPeak for much of the 2006 season, before teaming up with Elaine Youngs for the remainder of the 2006 season and up until the 2009 season. Branagh and Youngs competed at the 2008 Summer Olympics where they came in fifth.

Personal life
Branagh lives in Southern California with her wife and two children.

References

External links
 Nicole Branagh at the Association of Volleyball Professionals
 Nicole Branagh at the Beach Volleyball Major Series
 
 
 
 

1979 births
Living people
American women's volleyball players
American women's beach volleyball players
Beach volleyball players at the 2008 Summer Olympics
Olympic beach volleyball players of the United States
Volleyball players at the 2003 Pan American Games
Pan American Games bronze medalists for the United States
Minnesota Golden Gophers women's volleyball players
People from Orinda, California
Pan American Games medalists in volleyball
LGBT volleyball players
American LGBT sportspeople
Beach volleyball defenders
FIVB World Tour award winners
Medalists at the 2003 Pan American Games
21st-century American women